Kyle T. Webster is an American illustrator, designer, author and educator.

His illustration work has been published in The New Yorker, The New York Times, and other publications. 

He is the founder of the KyleBrush brand of Adobe Photoshop brushes that was acquired on October 18, 2017 by Adobe Systems. He now works for Adobe on drawing initiatives.

His picture book, "Please Say Please!" was published by Scholastic in July, 2016.

In the summer of 2017, He partnered with Adobe to digitally recreate seven of the original paintbrushes used by Norwegian artist, Edvard Munch, as part of an international competition inviting artists to use these digital brushes to create "The Fifth Scream."

Kyle lives in Winston-Salem, North Carolina with his wife, Sonja Webster, who founded the women's social and professional networking platform, "The Ladies Tea" in 2007, and his 2 children.

References

External links
 Official website

Year of birth missing (living people)
Living people
American magazine illustrators
American digital artists